Israel participated in the Eurovision Song Contest 2000 in Stockholm. PingPong represented Israel with the song "Sameach".

Before Eurovision

Internal selection 
83 songs were submitted by the public, which were subsequently evaluated by a special committee that selected the entry. The members of the committee were Irit Linor (radio entertainer and writer), Izhar Cohen (Eurovision Song Contest 1978 winner), Amos Oren (journalist), Gal Uchovsky (journalist), Itzik Jousha (journalist), Amir Kaminer (journalist), Yoav Ginay (composer), Menashe Lev-Ran (musician), Svetlana Alecsandrov (IBA representative) and Adi Hadar (IBA representative). On 6 January 2000, IBA announced that PingPong were selected as the Israeli representatives for the Eurovision Song Contest 2000 with the song "Sameach". The selection process caused controversy after one of the committee members, Irit Linor, declared that she was uninterested. When Linor was asked whether she thought PingPong's singing stood a chance, Linor replied: "Who cares?".

At Eurovision 
Israel scored 7 points, finishing 22nd.

Voting

References

2000
Countries in the Eurovision Song Contest 2000
Eurovision